Fa Hui Park is a park located north of Boundary Street, in Mong Kok, Kowloon, Hong Kong. It occupies . It is one of the sites where a Lunar New Year Fair is held every year.

There is a  community garden in the park. Participants of "Community Garden Programme" are allowed to grow crops and ornamental plants in the community garden of Fa Hui Park; they are also permitted to take the harvest home afterwards.

History
Before Fa Hui Park was built, 8,000 squatters lived there. On 1 November 1955, a disastrous fire devastated over 400 huts, killed four persons and left over 6,000 people homeless. On 22 October 1956, another fire made a further 2,000 people homeless. After accommodating the victims at various resettlement estates in Kowloon, the Government built Fa Hui Park there.

See also
 List of urban public parks and gardens in Hong Kong

References

Urban public parks and gardens in Hong Kong
Sham Shui Po District
Yau Yat Tsuen